Dardoqqaz (also, Dardokkaz) is a village in the Zaqatala Rayon of Azerbaijan. The village forms part of the municipality of Göyəm.

References

External links

Populated places in Zaqatala District